Voit is a German surname. Notable people with the surname include:
 August von Voit
 Brigitte Voit
 Carl von Voit
 Eszter Voit
 G. Mark Voit
 Luke Voit
 Otto Voit
 Robert Voit 
 David Voit

See also 
 Voight
 Voit Peak
 W. J. Voit Memorial Trophy

German-language surnames
Occupational surnames